Uberlândia–Tenenete Coronel Aviador César Bombonato Airport  is the airport serving Uberlândia, Brazil. Since 2001 the airport is named after the Uberlândia-born pilot of the Brazilian Air Force César Bombonato (1955-1998), who died in an air crash.

During a transitional period, the airport is jointly operated by Infraero and AENA.

History
The first flight to the site of the airport was operated on May 10, 1935 but the area was officially designated only on July 21, 1953.

In 1980, the administration of the airport was taken over by Infraero and on June 8, 2001 the name was officially changed to include a tribute to the aviator César Bombonato.

In 2005, the airport terminal was extensively renewed and enlarged. In 2007, the runway was extended.

Previously operated by Infraero, on August 18, 2022 the consortium AENA won a 30-year concession to operate the airport.

Airlines and destinations

Accidents and incidents
28 February 1952: a Panair do Brasil Douglas DC-3A-393 registration PP-PCN flying from Rio de Janeiro-Santos Dumont to Goiânia via Uberlândia. One of the wings struck a tree shortly after the pilot executed a go-around. The flight had been cleared to land at Uberlândia. Of the 31 occupants, 8 died.

Access

See also

List of airports in Brazil

References

External links

Airports in Minas Gerais
Airports established in 1953
Uberlândia